Pomabamba (possibly from Quechua puma cougar, puma, pampa a large plain, "cougar plain"), Rataquenua or Portachuelo is a mountain in the Cordillera Blanca in the Andes of Peru, of  high (other elevation cited is ). It is located between Asunción and Carhuaz provinces, in the region of  Ancash. Pomabamba lies between Copa to the west and Perlilla to the east, southwest of lakes Yanaqucha, Paqarisha (Pagarisha) and Lawriqucha.

References

Mountains of Peru
Mountains of Ancash Region